Rebecca Gablé (born 25 September 1964) is a German author of historical fiction. Gablé is best known for her medieval chivalry romances. She also works as a literary translator from English. 

After, leaving school, in 1984 she embarked on a one-year apprenticeship as a trainee bank clerk.   The one-year apprenticeship became four years as a bank worker.  During that time she was living close to a military base used by the British Royal Air Force:  she came into contact with the personnel there.   This led to an intense interest in English language and culture, reflected regularly in her subsequent literary output.   The commercial breakthrough came in 1997 with her first historical novel "Das Lächeln der Fortuna" (The Smile of Fortuna), of which in the first year after publication about 200,000 copies were sold. From 1999 to 2000, she was a lecturer at the Heinrich Heine University Düsseldorf in Old English literature. In 2000 she published "Das zweite Königreich" (The second kingdom), another history novel. Since then, Gablé has turned to the writing of historical novels, all of which went up in the bestseller lists. In addition to the ongoing series about the history of the (fictional) Waringham family, which is closely linked to the English ruling houses of the Middle Ages and the early modern period, Gablé wrote other novels, which also play in the Middle Ages.

Works
In English: 
 Fortune's Wheel
 The Settlers of Catan, based on the board game of the same name by Klaus Teuber. The novel was the inspiration for the Catan Adventures series of games: Candamir and Elasund.

In German:
 Detective novels
 Jagdfieber, 1995
 Die Farben des Chamäleons, 1996
 Das letzte Allegretto, 1998
 Das Floriansprinzip, 1999
 Waringham series
 Das Lächeln der Fortuna, 1997 (Fortune's Wheel)
 Die Hüter der Rose, 2005
 Das Spiel der Könige, 2007
 Der dunkle Thron, 2011
 Der Palast der Meere, 2015
 Teufelskrone, 2019
 Drachenbanner, 2022
 Helmsby series
 Das Zweite Königreich, 2000
 Hiobs Brüder, 2009
 Otto the Great series
 Das Haupt der Welt, 2013
 Die fremde Königin, 2017
 Other historical novels
 Der König der purpurnen Stadt, 2002 (with slight references to Waringham series)
 Other books
 Von Ratlosen und Löwenherzen, 2008 (popular science book about the English Middle Ages)

References

External links

Living people
20th-century German novelists
21st-century German novelists
1964 births
German women novelists
21st-century German women writers
20th-century German women writers